Qarah Bolagh (also Romanized as Qarah Bolāgh) is a village in Shirang Rural District, Kamalan District, Aliabad County, Golestan Province, Iran. At the 2006 census, its population was 2,446, in 523 families.

References 

Populated places in Aliabad County